Tholur  is a village in Thrissur district in the state of Kerala, India.

Demographics
 India census, Tholur had a population of 6225 with 2999 males and 3226 females.

References

Villages in Thrissur district